Ezginin Günlüğü (Melody's Diary in Turkish) is a Turkish band formed in 1982 in Istanbul by Emin İgüs, Hakan Yılmaz, Şebnem Başar, Tugay Başar, and Vedat Verter. Shortly after its foundation, three new members joined the band: Nadir Göktürk, Tanju Duru, and Cüneyt Duru.  They made their first concert in 1983.  Their first album, Seni Düşünmek (To think of You), was released in 1985. 

The original group dissolved itself in 1990, following personal disagreements on the kind of music different members wanted to make.  However, Nadir Göktürk, without the approval of the other group members, brought in new members and continued to perform under the same name.  Hüsnü Arkan and Fatih Saçlı have joined the band and the first album involving them, İstavrit, was released in 1993. The popularity of the band increased dramatically after the album Oyun released in 1995.

Ezginin Günlüğü is noted for their musical diversity and vocal harmonies. One of the strongest connections to their listeners is their use of the lyrics. In the 80s they were using well-known poems and singing songs with political allusions. In the 90s they were still using poems but they also started to write their own lyrics. Their music is based on Anatolian folk music, with a contemporary interpretation.

Discography
 Seni Düşünmek  ("To Think of You," 1985)
 Sabah Türküsü ("Morning Ballad," 1986)
 Alagözlü Yar ("Hazel-eyed Love," 1987)
 Bahçedeki Sandal ("The Boat in the Garden," 1988)
 Ölüdeniz ("Dead Sea," 1990)
 İstavrit ("Horse Mackerel," 1993)
 Oyun ("Game," 1995)
 Ebruli ("Variegated," 1996)
 Hürriyete Doğru ("Through to Freedom," 1997)
 Aşk Yüzünden ("Because of Love," 1998)
 Rüya ("Dream," 2000)
 Her Şey Yolunda ("Everything's Alright," 2002)
 İlk Aşk ("First Love," 2003)
 Dargın mıyız ("Are We Peeved," 2005)
 Çeyrek ("Quarter," 2007) (Tribute album. Ezginin Günlüğü songs by various Turkish artists)
 Eski Arkadaş ("Old Friend" 2010)
 İstanbul Gibi (2015)
 Aşk Zamanı (2018)
 40 Yıllık Şarkılar ("Songs of 40 Years" 2020)

Line up

Current members

 Nadir Göktürk - keyboards
 Deniz Sujana - vocals
 Mahmut Çınar - vocals
 Can Göktürk - woodwinds
 Deniz Bayrak - guitar
 Erkan Gürer - bass guitar
 Cafer İşleyen - flute, vocals
 Güven Şancı - drums

Former members
 Tanju Duru - guitar (d. October 2, 2008)
 Feyza Erenmemiş - vocals
 Emin İgüs - vocals
 Hakan Yılmaz - vocals
 Hüsnü Arkan - vocals
 Gülnaz Göver - vocals
 Sumru Ağıryürüyen - vocals
 Cüneyt Duru - bass guitar
 Vedat Verter - bağlama
 Göksun Doğan - clarinet
 Serdar Gönenç - drums
 Şebnem Başar - vocals
 Güneş Uras
 Cem Doğan
 İsmail Atalan
 Arzu Bursa - vocals
 Ebru Kalabas
 Fatih Saçlı - flute, saxophone
 Sedat Yapıcı - guitar
 Gökhan Tümkaya - drums
 Eylem Atmaca - vocals
 Çağrı Çetinsel - vocals
 Murat Kurt - guitar, vocals
 Cem Gezginti - drums

References

External links
  Official Site of Ezginin Gunlugu
 

Turkish musical groups
Musical groups from Istanbul
Folk rock groups
Turkish alternative rock groups
Musical groups established in 1982
1982 establishments in Turkey